Sihyaj Chan Kʼawiil II, also known as Storm Sky and Manikin Cleft Sky (died 3 February 456), was an ajaw of the Maya city of Tikal. He took the throne on 26 November 411 and reigned until his death. He was a son of his predecessor Yax Nuun Ahiin I and Lady Kʼinich, and a grandson of Spearthrower Owl. Stela 31, erected during his reign, describes the death of his grandfather in 439; other monuments associated with Sihyaj Chan Kʼawiil II are Stelae 1 and possibly Stelae 28. Tikal Temple 33 was Sihyaj Chan Kʼawiil II's funerary pyramid and his tomb was located beneath it.

Notes

Footnotes

References

Rulers of Tikal
5th century in the Maya civilization
5th-century monarchs in North America
Year of birth unknown
456 deaths